Legislative Assembly elections were held in Uttar Pradesh in 1991. The Bharatiya Janata Party remained the largest party, winning 221 of the 425 seats.

Results

Elected members

References
http://www.elections.in/uttar-pradesh/assembly-constituencies/1991-election-results.html
https://eci.gov.in/files/file/3257-uttar-pradesh-1991/

1991
Uttar Pradesh